There have been several licensed video games based on the Shrek franchise. They have been released on many different platforms, including PlayStation 2, Game Boy Advance, PlayStation Portable, Xbox 360, PlayStation 3, Wii, Microsoft Windows, and mobile devices.

Games

Main series
{| class="wikitable sortable" width="100%"
! width="25%" align="left" | Name
! align="left" | Date
! width="25%" align="left" | Platforms
! align="left" | Additional detail
|-
|| Shrek
|| 2001
|| Xbox, GameCube
| A launch title for the Xbox. Published by TDK. Also noted for being one of the first commercial video games to make use of deferred shading.
|-
|| Shrek 2
|| 2004
|| GameCube, PlayStation 2, Xbox, Game Boy Advance, Windows and J2ME
|| Published by Activision.
|-
|| Shrek the Third
|| 2007
|| Xbox 360, Windows, Wii, PlayStation 2, PlayStation Portable, Nintendo DS, Game Boy Advance and J2ME
|| The last DreamWorks Animation game to be released for the GBA. Versions for Xbox and GameCube were cancelled.Published by Activision.
|-
|| Shrek Forever After|| 2010
|| Xbox 360, Windows, Wii, PlayStation 3, Nintendo DS, iOS and J2ME
|| This is the first and only Shrek game on PS3.
|-
|}

Spinoffs
Not only have there been games based on the films, but there have also been spinoffs too. They include racing, party and fighting games, and many more.

Racing

Party

Other

Educational
There are quite a few educational Shrek games that exist for the V.Smile and V.Flash. They are aimed towards toddlers and young children. They include:

Critical reception

Overview
 The Game Boy Advance version of Shrek 2 received an IGN rating of 7.9, the highest of all the Shrek video games, while the PS2 version of the game received a score of 7.0.
 The PlayStation 2 version of Shrek: Super Party received the lowest IGN rating of all the Shrek video games with a score of 2.9. Shrek Extra Large was also received poorly, with a score of 3.0.
 Shrek: Fairy Tale Freakdown received an abysmal score of 0.5/10 from Game Informer.

Ratings

See also

 Shrek (series)
 Tony Hawk's Underground 2''

References

 Shrek video games. Retrieved on July 28, 2007.
 Shrek the Third: Arthur's School Day Adventure. Retrieved on July 28, 2007.

External links
 Activision's Shrek Page Information on Activision's Shrek video games

 
Lists of video games by franchise